Robert Stephen Miller (born August 1971) is a Church of Ireland priest.

Miller was educated at Queen's University Belfast and the Church of Ireland Theological College; and ordained in 1996. After a curacy at Lurgan he held incumbencies at Tullylish, Maghera and Derry. Since 2012 he has been the Archdeacon of Derry and rector of the joint group of parishes of Christ church, St Peter’s, Culmore and Muff. He ministers alongside his curate of the parishes, the Reverend Canon Katherine McAteer, who is the first female ordained minister within the diocese to be appointed as a canon of the chapter of St Columb's Cathedral in its over 400 years history.

References

1971 births
Archdeacons of Derry
Alumni of Queen's University Belfast
Alumni of the Church of Ireland Theological Institute
Living people